

National network list
All of the networks listed below operate a number of terrestrial TV stations. In addition, several of these networks are also aired on cable and satellite services.

Commercial
Six television networks in Mexico have more than 75% national coverage and are thus required to be carried by all pay TV providers and offered at no cost by the broadcaster. Additionally, these networks are also required to provide accessibility for the hearing impaired with the use of Closed Captioning and/or Mexican sign language.

Azteca Uno (TV Azteca)
ADN 40 (TV Azteca)
Las Estrellas (Televisa)
Imagen Televisión (Grupo Imagen)
Canal 5 (Televisa)
Azteca 7 (TV Azteca)
A+ (TV Azteca)

ADN 40 and A+ have coverage primarily provided by subchannels.

Noncommercial
Of the many noncommercial services, there are only two national networks of retransmitters:

Canal Once (Instituto Politécnico Nacional)
Sistema Público de Radiodifusión del Estado Mexicano (SPR)

The digital SPR retransmitters offer Canal Once along with these important noncommercial television services:

Canal 22
Canal Catorce
Ingenio TV
TV UNAM
Canal del Congreso

In addition to the latter, Canal Judicial is also required to be carried by all pay TV providers and offered at no cost by the broadcaster, although there is no terrestrial station that broadcasts this network.

Regional or limited coverage commercial networks

There are some networks operating in Mexico which have limited coverage or primarily serve a region in particular.
Currently, there are three networks of this kind which have a significant coverage:

Canal 6 (Multimedios)
Nu9ve (Televisa)
Canal 13 (Albavisión México)

Other regional/limited networks include:

El Canal de las Noticias (Intermedia) (Mexicali and the State of Chihuahua)
ABC Televisión (State of Chihuahua)
TV MAR (Los Cabos and La Paz in Baja California Sur and Puerto Vallarta, Jalisco)
Foro TV (Televisa)
Milenio Televisión (Multimedios)
Teleritmo (Multimedios)
CV Shopping 
MVS TV

State-level broadcast television networks
Mexico also has government-run state television networks in 26 of its 32 federal units:

See also
List of television stations in Mexico

General:
 Television in Mexico

References